The HTC One VX is an Android smartphone designed and manufactured by HTC. Released on November 16, 2012, by AT&T, it is a mid-range device carrying design traits from the remaining One series devices (such as the One X).

See also 
 HTC One series

References 

Android (operating system) devices
One VX
Discontinued smartphones